Rowan's Report is an ITV documentary series, shown over nineteen fifteen minute episodes. The series follows Nick Rowan as each week he interviews some of the country's most successful children. The series was produced by Yorkshire Television and distributed by 	Thames Television.

Episodes

Series 1

Series 2

References

External links
Rowan's Report at British Film Institute
Rowan's Report at IMDb

1980s British drama television series
1982 British television series debuts
1983 British television series endings
ITV documentaries
English-language television shows
Television shows set in the United Kingdom